The Pondville Correctional Center is a minimum security/pre-release Massachusetts state prison. It is located 36 miles southwest of Boston, Massachusetts in the town of Norfolk, Massachusetts.  Because this is a minimum security facility, there are no walls or fences to keep prisoners in.  Security is maintained by inmate counts and strict accountability procedures. On January 6, 2020, there were 151 inmates in general population beds.

Accreditation
This facility was re-accredited by the American Correctional Association (ACA) signifying and adherence to national standards.  In May 2003, PCC was also re-accredited by the National Commission on Correctional Health Care(NCCHC), in conjunction with its privatized medical services.

Prison Address
Pondville Correctional Center 
PO Box 146 
Norfolk, MA 02056

Covid Cases
Pursuant to the Supreme Judicial Court's April 3, 2020 Opinion and Order in the Committee for Public Counsel Services v. Chief Justice of the Trial Court, SJC-12926 matter, as amended on April 10, April 28 and June 23, 2020 (the “Order”), the Special Master posts weekly reports which are located on the SJC website here for COVID testing and cases for each of the correctional facilities administered by the Department of Correction and each of the county Sheriffs’ offices. The SJC Special master link above has the most up to date information reported by the correctional agencies and is posted for the public to view.

References

Buildings and structures in Norfolk County, Massachusetts
Prisons in Massachusetts